Cannet is a former commune in the Gers department in southwestern France. On 1 January 2019, it was merged into the commune Riscle.

Geography

Population

See also
Communes of the Gers department

References

Former communes of Gers
Populated places disestablished in 2019